Wooden Coaster - Fireball (Chinese: 谷木游龙) is a wooden roller coaster located at Happy Valley in Songjiang, Shanghai, China. The coaster was designed by American wooden coaster designers The Gravity Group and manufactured by Martin & Vleminckx. It opened on August 16, 2009 as China's first wooden roller coaster.

Awards

References 

Wooden roller coasters

Roller coasters in China